Anthemis arvensis, also known as corn chamomile, mayweed, scentless chamomile, or field chamomile is a species of flowering plant in the genus Anthemis, in the aster family. It is used as an ornamental plant.

Distribution

Native
Palearctic
Macaronesia: Azores, Canary Islands
Northern Africa: Algeria, Tunisia
Western Asia: Sinai, Iran, Iraq, Saudi Arabia, Turkey
Caucasus: Georgia, North Caucasus
Northern Europe: Denmark, Finland, Ireland, Norway, Sweden, United Kingdom
Central Europe: Austria, Belgium, Czech Republic, Slovakia, Germany, Hungary, Netherlands, Poland, Switzerland
East Europe: Belarus, Moldova, Ukraine, Crimea
Southeastern Europe: Albania, Bosnia and Herzegovina, Bulgaria, Croatia, Greece, Crete, Italy, Republic of Macedonia, Montenegro, Romania, Sardinia, Serbia, Sicily, Slovenia
Southwestern Europe: France Corsica, Portugal, Spain, Balearic Islands

Introduced
Widely naturalized in North and South America, Africa, Australia, New Zealand, and parts of Asia.

Subspecies
Subspecies accepted by the Plant List maintained by Kew Gardens in London
 Anthemis arvensis subsp. arvensis 
 Anthemis arvensis subsp. cyllenea (Halácsy) R.Fern.
 Anthemis arvensis subsp. incrassata (Loisel.) Nyman
 Anthemis arvensis subsp. sphacelata (C.Presl) R.Fern.

References

External links

BBC Gardening: Anthemis arvensis 
Plants For A Future: Anthemis arvensis 
Anthemis arvensis 
Anthemis arvensis

Anthemis
Flora of Europe
Plants described in 1753
Taxa named by Carl Linnaeus